Maureen Jennings (born 1939) is a British Canadian writer, most well known for the Detective Murdoch Series, the basis for the television series Murdoch Mysteries. She is credited as a Creative Consultant and occasionally writer for the show.

Biography 
Maureen Jennings was born and grew up in Birmingham, England. She attended Saltley Grammar School. Jennings emigrated to Canada with her mother when she was seventeen. She studied psychology and philosophy at the University of Windsor and an MA in English Literature at the University of Toronto. Jennings initially taught at Ryerson Polytechnical Institute and later practised as a psychotherapist. Her first successful writing was stage plays.

Jennings is best known as the author of the Detective Murdoch Series, which has been turned into a television series. As of 2019, her most recent novel, Heat Wave, introduces Murdoch's son as a police detective in 1936.

The television drama Bomb Girls was based on a concept Jennings developed.

Jennings was awarded the Grant Allen Award in 2011 as a pioneer in crime fiction.

She lives in Toronto.

Bibliography

Fiction

Detective Murdoch series
John Wilson Murray, who was appointed as Ontario's first government detective in 1875, "was an important inspiration" for Jennings and led to the development of the character William Murdoch.

 Except the Dying (1997)
 Under the Dragon's Tail (1998)
 Poor Tom Is Cold (2001)
 Let Loose the Dogs (2003)
 Night's Child (2005) 
 Vices of My Blood (2006)
 A Journeyman to Grief (2007)
 Let Darkness Bury the Dead (2017)

Christine Morris series

 Does Your Mother Know? (2006)
 The K Handshape (2008)

Detective Inspector Tom Tyler series

 Season of Darkness (2011)
 Beware This Boy (2012)
 No Known Grave (2014)
 Dead Ground in Between (2016)

Charlotte Frayne, PI

 Heat Wave: A Paradise Café Mystery (2019)

 November Rain: A Paradise Café Mystery (2020)

Non-fiction

 The Map of Your Mind: Journeys Into Creative Expression (2001)

References

External links
 
 Interview with Jennings at Shots Magazine
 Interview with Jennings at TV, eh?

Living people
1939 births
20th-century Canadian novelists
21st-century Canadian novelists
20th-century Canadian women writers
21st-century Canadian women writers
Canadian mystery writers
Canadian non-fiction writers
Canadian women novelists
Canadian historical novelists
Canadian women non-fiction writers
20th-century English novelists
21st-century English novelists
20th-century English women writers
21st-century English women writers
English mystery writers
English non-fiction writers
English women novelists
English historical novelists
English emigrants to Canada
English women non-fiction writers
Writers from Birmingham, West Midlands
Women mystery writers
Women historical novelists
People educated at Saltley Grammar School
University of Toronto alumni
University of Windsor alumni